The Ivor Novello Awards are held annually since 1956 by the Ivors Academy, formerly the British Academy of Songwriters, Composers and Authors, to recognize the excellence in songwriting and composing. The following list consists of all the winners and nominees of the awards by year, the winners are listed first and in bold followed by the nominees if present.

The awards and/or nominations are received by the songwriters of the nominated work, not the performers, unless they also have songwriting credits.

1990s
1990

The 35th Ivor Novello Awards were presented on April 2, 1990, at the Grosvenor House, London.

1991

The 36th Ivor Novello Awards were presented on May 2, 1991, at the Grosvenor House, London.

1992

The 37th Ivor Novello Awards were presented in May 1992 at the Grosvenor House, London.

1993

The 38th Ivors were presented on May 26, 1993 at the Grosvenor House, London.

1994

The 39th Ivors were presented on May 25, 1994 at the Grosvenor House, London.

1995

The 40th Ivors were presented on May 23, 1995, at the Grosvenor House, London.

2002

The 47th Ivor Novello Awards were presented on May 23, 2002 at the Grosvenor House, London.

2003

The 48th Ivor Novello Awards were presented on May 22, 2003 at the Grosvenor House, London.

2004

The 49th Ivor Novello Awards were presented on May 27, 2004 at the Grosvenor House, London.

2005

The 50th Ivor Novello Awards were presented on May 26, 2005 at the Grosvenor House, London.

2006

The 51st Ivor Novello Awards were presented on May 25, 2006 at the Grosvenor House, London.

2007

The 52nd Ivor Novello Awards were presented on May 24, 2007 at the Grosvenor House, London.

2008

The 53rd Ivor Novello Awards were presented on May 22, 2008 at the Grosvenor House, London.

2009

The 54th Ivor Novello Awards were held at the Grosvenor House, Park Lane, London on May 21, 2009.

References

External links

 Ivor Awards archive